The Assonet Burying Ground is the main public cemetery for Freetown, Massachusetts.

Prior to becoming a cemetery, the land occupied by the Assonet Burying Ground was used as a military musterfield for the southeastern Massachusetts area. The remaining  were acquired from the heirs of Wallace T. Reynolds in 1956. Remains from two other cemeteries were moved to the Assonet Burying Ground, one cemetery having been disestablished, and the other having been reduced in size.

The entrance to the cemetery is on South Main Street, marked by two stone gates erected sometime prior to 1954.  Near the entrance to the main cemetery is an abandoned receiving tomb, built of granite into the side of an earthen mound in 1892.  East of the receiving tomb is a brick mausoleum, and on the northern edge of the cemetery is a tool shed built prior to 1910.

The cemetery is bounded on the north by the Assonet River, on the south by a residential subdivision, on the east by MA 24, and on the west by MA 79.  The cemetery is at the southern extreme of the Assonet Historic District.

Veterans Section 
A special section of the cemetery for veterans, spouses, and dependents opened in 2012.

Notable burials
 Maj. John M. Deane, recipient of the Medal of Honor for action during the American Civil War
 Preston Hubbard, bass player
 Mrs. Damaris Jones, wife of Elder Abner Jones
 Gen. Ebenezer W. Peirce, Civil War officer, local historian, and author
 Tec White, professional soccer player, Fall River Marksmen and New Bedford Whalers

References

18th-century establishments in Massachusetts
Freetown, Massachusetts
Cemeteries in Bristol County, Massachusetts
Cemeteries established in the 1800s